The 2010 Virginia National Bank Men's Pro Championship was a professional tennis tournament played on outdoor hard courts. It was the second edition of the tournament which was part of the 2010 ATP Challenger Tour. It took place in Charlottesville, United States between 1 and 7 November 2010.

ATP entrants

Seeds

 Rankings are as of October 25, 2010.

Other entrants
The following players received wildcards into the singles main draw:
  Theodoros Angelinos
  Alexander Domijan
  Treat Conrad Huey
  Jarmere Jenkins

The following players received entry as an alternate into the singles main draw:
  Ryler DeHeart

The following players received entry from the qualifying draw:
  Yuki Bhambri
  Michael Shabaz
  Fritz Wolmarans
  Michael Yani

Champions

Singles

 Robert Kendrick def.  Michael Shabaz, 6–2, 6–3

Doubles

 Robert Kendrick /  Donald Young def.  Ryler DeHeart /  Pierre-Ludovic Duclos, 7–6(5), 7–6(3)

External links
Charlottesville Tennis Resorts official website
ITF Search
2010 Combo Sheet

Virginia National Bank Men's Pro Championship
Charlottesville Men's Pro Challenger